During World War I, several Kurdish rebellions took place within the Ottoman Empire.

The rebellions were preceded by the emergence of early Kurdish nationalism and Kurdish revolts in Bitlis in 1907 and early 1914. The primary Kurdish war aim was the creation of an independent Kurdish state, a goal that Britain and Russia promised to fulfil in order to incite Kurdish resistance. Other reasons for resistance include a fear that they would suffer the same fate as the Armenians, the desire for more autonomy, and according to Ottoman sources, banditry.

The first Kurdish rebellion was launched in August 1914, before the Ottoman entry into World War I. From 1915 to 1916, further Kurdish rebellions took place in Botan, Dersim, and south of Kiğı. 1917 saw 2 additional waves of rebellion in summer and August, the latter of which received Russian military support. Besides direct military opposition, Kurdish civilians also partook in passive resistance by assisting advancing Russian forces, hiding or adopting Armenian refugees during the genocide, and resisting Ottoman military drafts. Shortly before the Armistice of Mudros in October 1918, Mahmud Barzanji broke away from the Ottoman Empire and established a quasi-independent Kurdish state under British supervision.

British wartime promises of an independent Kurdistan were included in the Treaty of Sèvres (1920), which assigned a small amount of territory for a planned Kurdish state, but these plans were abandoned with the Turkish nationalist victory in the Turkish War of Independence and the ensuing Treaty of Lausanne (1923). Kurdish rebellions in Turkey continued after 1923 and are still ongoing in the present day.

Several villages were looted, burned or destroyed by both the Kurdish rebels and the Ottoman authorities. In reprisal to the rebellions, Ottoman authorities deported large populations of Kurds.

Background 
The rebellions were preceded by the emergence of early Kurdish nationalism and Kurdish revolts in Bitlis in 1907 and early 1914.

Kurdish aims 
The Kurds hoped that the Allies of World War I would aid them in creating an independent Kurdish nation if they were to fight against the Ottomans. Indeed, Britain and Russia promised to support Kurdish independence to encourage resistance. As the war progressed, the advance of Russian troops into the Eastern Anatolian hinterland with an idea of the "Liberation of Armenia" gradually turned (for a while) into an unspoken "Liberation of Kurdistan". Other reasons for resistance include a fear that they would suffer the same fate as the Armenians, as well as increasing autonomy.

Ottoman staff officer Barhan Ozkok, writing in 1932, attributes Kurdish resistance to a desire for independence as well as banditry.

A 2022 article by Turkish academic Erhan Taş contests claims that Kurdish resistance (specifically the 1916 Dersim revolt) was driven by nationalism or a desire for independence, as these are not backed by contemporary war documents and based on statements by authors writing in later decades.

Timeline

Initial revolt (1914) 
The first Kurdish rebellion during World War I took place prior to the Ottoman entry into World War I. In August 1914, the nephew of the mayor of Dersim was killed by a member of the Ferhatuşağı tribe, and in response to Ottoman reprisals the Ferhatuşağı tribe rebelled. The Ferhatuşağı were joined by the Karaballı, Lower Abbas, Abbasuşağı and Koçuşağı tribes. The murder of the chieftain of the Ferhatuşağı tribe ended the rebellion.

Uprising in Botan (1915–1916) 
In spring 1915, a Kurdish revolt broke out in Botan. The revolt drove out the Ottoman troops entirely and as a result, the locals would govern the region for over a year.

Uprising in Dersim, Ottoman deportations (1916) 
The Dersim uprising of 1916 was an Alevi Kurdish uprising led by Ali Ağa in the region of Dersim. Its causes laid in the Kurdish fear that they would suffer the same fate as the Armenians, as well as the desire to remove the state control in Dersim. This revolt was encouraged by Russian emissaries, who had promised to local chieftains that Dersim would be given independence after Russian occupation.

The uprising began in early March 1916. Kurdish rebels occupied and destroyed the towns of Nazimiye, Mazght, Pertek, and Charsandjak, and then marched towards the residence of the province governor (vali), Mamuretülaziz (modern day Elazığ). As the Kurds advanced, they captured many weapons from Turkish soldiers. Turkish officials in Mezere and Harput felt extremely threatened by the Kurdish revolt, since the Russians at the time occupied the area between Erzurum and Erzincan which adjoined Dersim to the north. The Ottoman army would likely to be incapable of resisting a coordinated Kurdish-Russian advance on Harput, leading the Muslim population of that settlement to make preparations to escape.

In response to the Kurdish rebellion, Ottoman authorities launched an operation to clear Dersim from Kurdish rebels on 1 April. Involved in this operation was the Ottoman 13th division, led by Galatalı Şevket Bey. This division included a contingent of troops led by Hasan Khayri Bey, as well as Shafi’i Kurds. On the day following the start of the operation, Kurdish rebels launched an unsuccessful counterattack on Pertek. Kurdish rebels were defeated at Kayacı, Mazgirt (13 April) and Şimaligarbî (16 April). By 16 April, the rebels had been reduced to an area between Nazimiye and the Ohi stream. On 18 April, after defeating 500 rebels in the area, Ottoman troops looted Kavaktepe and the surrounding villages. The next day, they burned down the village of Lemit. As Ottoman troops advanced, they clashed with Kurds at Şeyhin, Kopik (22 April), Gökerik Hill, Sinevartaşı (23 April), and Zelbaba Hill (28 April).

On 2 May, the Kurdish rebels surrendered. The operation had concluded with the defeat of the rebels, who had suffered heavy casualties. With the situation now having come under Ottoman control, the preparations of the Muslim civilians of Harput to escape had been rendered obsolete. After the defeat of the uprising, entire populations of the responsible tribes were deported from Dersim.

Kurds threaten the Ottoman rear (1916) 

By late 1916, the Ottomans had suffered severe defeats at the hands of the Russians, having suffered a particularly severe defeat at Bingöl. This led the Kurds to once again rise up against Ottoman authorities. Ottoman convoys in Dersim were attacked and isolated units slaughtered. From September to October 1916, Kurdish rebel efforts turned the situation of the Ottoman rear south of Kiğı into one of "insecurity and disorder".

In October, the Kurdish rebellion, alongside other factors, led Ottoman general Ahmed Izzet Pasha to withdraw troops from the front, which then suppressed the rebellion.

Uprisings in Botan, Dersim, and Kharput (Summer 1917) 
In summer 1917, Kurdish rebellions took place in Botan, Dersim, and Kharput.

Uprisings in Mardin, Diyarbekir, Bitlis, Russian involvement (August 1917) 
In early August 1917, Kurdish rebellions took place in Mardin and Diyarbekir, followed by Bitlis. While the other Kurdish uprisings received no military support by the Allies of World War I, the uprisings of August 1917 received limited Russian support.

Mahmud Barzanji establishes a Kurdish state (1918) 

With the collapse of the Ottoman Empire in October 1918, Mahmud Barzanji sought to break away from the Ottomans and create an autonomous southern Kurdistan under British supervision. He was elected as the head of government by a council of Kurdish notables in the Sulaimaniya region, and as soon as the British captured Kirkuk (25 October 1918) he captured Ottoman troops present in his district and declared the end of Ottoman rule, declaring allegiance to Britain. Other Kurdish regions followed suit, such as Rania and Keuisenjaq. This resulted in the creation of a quasi-independent Kurdish state, which lasted until it was it was dissolved by Britain in June 1919, following a rebellion.

Passive resistance

Kurdish civilian support for Russian forces 
On 2 August 1916, the Ottoman Second Army led by Ahmed Izzet Pasha began an offensive to recapture Malazgirt from Russia. Russia responded by rushing experienced mountain units to stem Ottoman attacks. Kurdish civilians hostile to the Ottoman Empire helped Russian forces find uncharted tracks across the mountains. The Ottoman offensive came to a halt in early September and finished on 26 September 1916.

Kurdish civilian opposition to the Armenian genocide 
During the Armenian genocide, some Kurdish civilians hid or adopted Armenian refugees.

Kurdish resistance to Ottoman recruitment 
Although tens of thousands of Kurds served for the Ottoman army during World War I, recruitment attempts were not always successful. In Diyarbekir and Bitlis, only a tiny portion of Kurdish tribesmen subscribed to the Hamidiye, while, for instance, in Dersim, everybody refused to join. Lack of military enthusiasm was commonly noticed among the Kurds in the Ottoman Army, with Kurdish forces frequently showing contempt for orders and avoidance of responsibility. Ottoman leadership often distrusted Kurds, and deliberately equipped them with an insufficient amount of outmoded armaments and ammunition. Kurdish desertions were common, and almost no Kurdish soldiers remained in the Ottoman Army by the end of the war.

Casualties

Military 
Ottoman staff officer Barhan Ozkok, writing in 1932, states that Kurdish rebels suffered 300 killed and 200 captured in a battle on 28 April 1916 during the Dersim revolt. He further mentions 100 Kurdish soldiers being killed on 1–2 May. He does not provide figures for the entire 1916 Dersim rebellion, nor does he provide figures on Ottoman losses. Yakup Kaya writes that Kurdish forces had suffered heavy casualties during the 1916 Dersim revolt.

Civilian 

During the 1916 Dersim rebellion, Kurdish rebels destroyed the villages of Nazimiye, Mazght, Pertek, and Charsandjak. Ottoman forces responded to the rebellion by looting Kavaktepe and the surrounding villages. They also burned down the village of Lemit.

In response to Kurdish rebellions, Ottoman authorities carried out deportations against Kurdish civilians. Most sources suggest that as many as 700,000 Kurds were deported during World War I, although there are no reliable statistics. Safrastian (1945) estimates that half of these deported Kurds died. Üngör (2009) writes that "it would require a separate study to calculate meticulously how many were deported".

Aftermath

Kurds gain concessions (1919-1920) 

The Kurds submitted their claim for independence to the Paris Peace Conference in 1919. According to the Treaty of Sèvres, the Kurdistan region, including Mosul Province, was scheduled to have a referendum to decide its fate.

There was no general agreement among Kurds on what the borders of Kurdistan should be because of the disparity between the areas of Kurdish settlement and the political and administrative boundaries of the region. The outlines of Kurdistan as an entity had been proposed in 1919 by Şerif Pasha, who represented the Society for the Elevation of Kurdistan (Kürdistan Teali Cemiyeti) at the Paris Peace Conference. He defined the region's boundaries as follows:The frontiers of Turkish Kurdistan, from an ethnographical point of view, begin in the north at Ziven, on the Caucasian frontier, and continue westwards to Erzurum, Erzincan, Kemah, Arapgir, Besni and Divick (Divrik?); in the south they follow the line from Harran, Sinjar Mountains, Tel Asfar, Erbil, Süleymaniye, Akk-el-man, Sinne; in the east, Ravandiz, Başkale, Vezirkale, that is to say the frontier of Persia as far as Mount Ararat.That caused controversy among other Kurdish nationalists, as it excluded the Van Region (possibly as a sop to Armenian claims to that region). Emin Ali Bedir Khan proposed an alternative map that included Van and an outlet to the sea via what is now Turkey's Hatay Province. Amid a joint declaration by Kurdish and Armenian delegations, Kurdish claims concerning Erzurum vilayet and Sassoun (Sason) were dropped, but arguments for sovereignty over Ağrı and Muş remained.

Neither proposal was endorsed by the treaty of Sèvres, which outlined a truncated Kurdistan on what is now Turkish territory (leaving out the Kurds of Iran, British-controlled Iraq and French-controlled Syria).

Koçgiri rebellion (1921) 

The Turkish War of Independence (19 May 1919 – 24 July 1923) was fought between the Turkish National Movement and the Allied powers—namely Greece in the West, Armenia on the East, France on the South, royalists and the separatists in various cities, and the United Kingdom and Italy in Constantinople (now Istanbul)—after parts of the Ottoman Empire were occupied and partitioned following the Ottomans' defeat in World War I.

During this war, Kurdish rebels fought against the Ankara government in the Koçgiri rebellion. After the Treaty of Sèvres was signed the Kurds began to feel more trustful that they were able to reach at least some sort of an autonomous government for themselves. Abdulkadir Ubeydullah, the son of Sheikh Ubeydullah and the president of the SAK, supported the idea of a Kurdish autonomy within Turkey. But Nuri Dersimi and Mustafa Pasha wanted more than autonomy, they wanted to establish an independent Kurdistan according to article 64 of the treaty. Mustafa Kemal followed up on the events in the Dersim area and as it came to his knowledge that some of the Kurds were pursuing autonomy in line with the fourteen points announced by US president Woodrow Wilson, he answered that the plan of Wilson was worthless for the peoples in the eastern provinces and they should rather follow his Turkish nationalist movement. The rebellion began in the overwhelmingly militant Koçgiri region in eastern present-day Sivas Province in February 1921. The rebels were crushed by June 17, 1921.

Concessions abandoned (1923) 

After Turkish nationalist victories in the Turkish–Armenian, Franco-Turkish and Greco-Turkish fronts (often referred to as the Eastern Front, the Southern Front, and the Western Front of the Turkish War of Independence, respectively), the Treaty of Sèvres was abandoned and new treaties were signed. The Treaty of Lausanne (1923) failed to mention the Kurds.

After Lausanne (1923-present) 
Kurdish rebellions in Turkey continued after the Treaty of Lausanne. In the 1920s and 1930s, there were the Beytussebab rebellion (1924), Sheikh Said rebellion (1925), Ararat rebellion (1927-1930), and the Dersim Rebellion (1937-1938). The current phase of Kurdish-Turkish conflict began in 1978.

See also
  (1897–1938)

References

Sources

External links 
 DERSİM TARİHİNDEN NOTLAR: 1916 İSYANI

Military operations of World War I involving the Ottoman Empire
Rebellions against the Ottoman Empire
History of the Kurdish people